Jugganauts: The Best Of Insane Clown Posse is the ninth compilation album by American hip hop group Insane Clown Posse. Released by Island Records, the album contains songs from 1997 to 2000, from the albums The Great Milenko, The Amazing Jeckel Brothers, Bizzar and Bizaar. It is the group's 25th overall release.

All tracks are digitally remastered by Gavin Lurssen.

Track listing

Chart positions

References

2007 greatest hits albums
Insane Clown Posse compilation albums
Island Records compilation albums